Marina Gmizić, better known as Marina Petrova,(born February 6, 1939) is a Serbian film actress known for her performances in West German productions of the 1950s and 1960s such as .

She retired from acting following her marriage to Roy Jenson. Their son is actor Sasha Jenson.

Selected filmography
 The Street (1958)
 Endangered Girls (1958)
 The Blue Moth (1959)
  (1959)
 Oriental Nights (1960)
 Der rote Rausch (1962)

References

Bibliography
 André Schneider. Die Feuerblume: Über Marisa Mell und ihre Filme. 2013.

External links

1939 births
Living people
Serbian film actresses
Serbian television actresses
Yugoslav film actresses
Yugoslav emigrants to Germany